This is a summary of the year 2013 in the Canadian music industry.

Events
 January 9 – Adam Gontier, lead singer of the Canadian rock band Three Days Grace, resigns from the band, citing health concerns.
March 10 – 2013 East Coast Music Awards
April 17 – Steve Jocz, former drummer of Sum 41, resigns from the band.
April 21 – Juno Awards of 2013
May 25 – Online streaming service CBC Music sponsors the first CBC Music Festival at Ontario Place's new Echo Beach music venue.
June 13 – Preliminary longlist for the 2013 Polaris Music Prize is announced.
July 10 – Mo Kenney and Keith Kouna are named the English and French winners of the 2013 SOCAN Songwriting Prize.
July 16 – Shortlist for the Polaris Music Prize is announced.
September 23 – Godspeed You! Black Emperor's 'Allelujah! Don't Bend! Ascend! is announced as the winner of the Polaris Music Prize.

Bands reformed
Despistado

Albums released

A
Anciients, Heart of Oak
Arcade Fire, Reflektor – October 28
Austra, Olympia – June 18

B
Jason Bajada, Le résultat de mes bétises
Jill Barber, Chansons – January 29
 The Beaches, The Beaches
Bear Mountain, XO
Daniel Bélanger, Chic de ville – March 5
The Besnard Lakes, Until in Excess, Imperceptible UFO
The Bicycles, Stop Thinking So Much
Justin Bieber, Believe Acoustic – January 29
Bleu Jeans Bleu, Haute couture
Born Ruffians, Birthmarks – April 16
Basia Bulat, Tall Tall Shadow – September 30
Louise Burns, The Midnight Mass – July 9

C
 Chic Gamine, Closer
City and Colour, The Hurry and the Harm, June 4
Classified, Classified – January 22
The Cliks, Black Tie Elevator
Corridor, Un magicien en toi
Counterparts, The Difference Between Hell and Home – July 24
 Eliana Cuevas, Espejo

D
Thomas D'Arcy, What We Want
The Deep Dark Woods, Jubilee
Devours, Dignity
DIANA, Perpetual Surrender
Céline Dion, Loved Me Back to Life

E
Fred Eaglesmith, Tambourine
Elephant Stone, Elephant Stone

F
Stephen Fearing, Between Hurricanes
Michael Feuerstack, Tambourine Death Bed – May 7
Fresh Snow, I
 Front Line Assembly, Echogenetic – July 9
Fur Trade, Don't Get Heavy

G
Ghostkeeper, Horse Chief! War Thief!
Grand Analog, Modern Thunder, August 20
The Grapes of Wrath, High Road – March 19
Jim Guthrie, Takes Time – May 7

H
Hayden, Us Alone – February 5
Headstones, Love + Fury – July 23
The Hidden Cameras, Age
Hilotrons, At Least There's Commotion – February 5
Hollerado, White Paint
Hooded Fang, Gravez

I
Imaginary Cities, Fall of Romance – May 28

K
k-os, BLack on BLonde – January 29
Ian Kelly, All These Lines – November 5
Koriass, Rue des Saules
Keith Kouna, Le voyage d’hiver
Aidan Knight, Telecommunicate
Nicholas Krgovich, Who Cares?

L
Mélissa Laveaux, Dying Is a Wild Night
Avril Lavigne, Avril Lavigne
Lee Harvey Osmond, The Folk Sinner – January 15
Light Fires, Light Fires
Murray Lightburn, Mass:Light
Lightning Dust, Fantasy
 Rob Lutes, The Bravest Birds

M
Greg MacPherson, Fireball – October 29
Maestro Fresh Wes, Orchestrated Noise – June 25
Magneta Lane, Witchrock – February 12
Majical Cloudz, Impersonator – May 21
Dylan Menzie, Heather Avenue
Millimetrik, Remix the Rhymes
Ruth Moody, These Wilder Things

N
Naturally Born Strangers, The LegendsLeague Presents: Naturally Born Strangers
New Country Rehab, Ghost of Your Charms – March 5
The New Mendicants, Australia 2013 E.P.

O
Odds, the Most Beautiful Place on Earth – February 21

P
Dorothea Paas, A Thirst

R
Corin Raymond, Paper Nickels
Lee Reed and John P, Written Large 
Amanda Rheaume, Keep a Fire
Daniel Romano, Come Cry With Me – January 22
Justin Rutledge, Valleyheart – February 12

S
The Sadies, Internal Sounds – September 17
Sarahmée, Sans détour
Ron Sexsmith, Forever Endeavour
Shad, Flying Colours – October 15
Shotgun Jimmie, Everything Everything
Skinny Puppy, Weapon – May 28
SNFU, Never Trouble Trouble Until Trouble Troubles You – October 24
Rae Spoon, My Prairie Home 
The Strumbellas, We Still Move on Dance Floors – October 22
Suuns, Images du futur
Swollen Members, Beautiful Death Machine – March 19

T
Tegan and Sara, Heartthrob – January 29
 Tire le coyote, Mitan
Maylee Todd, Escapology, April 2
A Tribe Called Red, Nation II Nation
Two Hours Traffic, Foolish Blood

V
Diyet van Lieshout, When You Were King
Various Artists, Arts & Crafts: 2003–2013
Various Artists, Arts & Crafts: X – May 28
Leif Vollebekk, North Americana
Lindy Vopnfjörð, Young Waverer

W
Martha Wainwright, Trauma: Chansons de la serie tele Saison 4 – February 26
Wake Owl, Wild Country – January 29
Dawn Tyler Watson and Paul Deslauriers, Southland
Whitehorse, The Road to Massey Hall – February 15
Woodpigeon, Thumbtacks + Glue
Donovan Woods, Don't Get Too Grand – March 26

Y
Yamantaka // Sonic Titan, UZU
Ken Yates, twenty-three
Young Galaxy, Ultramarine

Top hits on record 
The lists are updated weekly through Nielsen Soundscan.

Top 10 Canadian albums

Top 10 International albums

Top 10 singles

Canadian Hot 100 Year-End List

Deaths
 January 7 – Kent Abbott, 32, rock musician (Grade)
 January 15 – Yuli Turovsky, 73, Russian-born conductor and cellist (I Musici de Montréal Chamber Orchestra)
 January 25 – Normand Corbeil, 56, composer
 March 6 – Stompin' Tom Connors, 77, country singer-songwriter
 April 16 – Rita MacNeil, 68, country and folk singer-songwriter
 April 17 – George Beverly Shea, 104, gospel musician
 May 5 – Greg Quill, 66, Australian-born musician and music critic for the Toronto Star
 May 8 – Bill Langstroth, 81, country music producer (Singalong Jubilee), inducted into Canadian Country Music Hall of Fame (2011).
 June 2 – Mario Bernardi, 82, conductor of the National Arts Centre Orchestra
 June 3 – Chris Levoir, 31, singer and guitarist for The Mark Inside
 August 18 – Wes Dakus, 75, rock and rockabilly musician

References